"Too Much Sauce" is a single by American disk jockey DJ Esco, released on August 19, 2016, by A1 Records, Freebandz and Epic Records, as the lead single from his mixtape Project E.T. (2016). The song, which was produced by  Zaytoven, features vocals from American rappers Future and Lil Uzi Vert.

Music video
The music video for "Too Much Sauce", directed by Rick Nyce, was released on October 14, 2016 on DJ Esco's Vevo account.

Commercial performance
The single peaked at number 50 on the US Billboard Hot 100. It is DJ Esco's only and highest-charting single. The song was certified Platinum by the Recording Industry Association of America (RIAA) for earning 1,000,000 equivalent units in the United States.

Charts

Weekly charts

Year-end charts

Certifications

References

2016 songs
2016 singles
American hip hop songs
Trap music songs
Lil Uzi Vert songs
Future (rapper) songs
Songs written by Future (rapper)
Songs written by Lil Uzi Vert
Songs written by Zaytoven
Song recordings produced by Zaytoven